Zetta Elliott (born October 26, 1972) is a Canadian-American poet, playwright, and author. Her first picture book Bird, won many awards. She has also been recognized for other contributions to children's literature, as well as for her essays, plays, and young adult novels.

Life 
Elliott was born in Ajax, Ontario, Canada, on October 26, 1972. She has lived in America for most of her adult life, having moved to Brooklyn in 1994 to begin as a student at New York University (NYU). More recently, she moved to Philadelphia. She holds a PhD in American studies from NYU and has worked as a professor at several colleges.

Writing 
Elliott's works include recovering from urban violence and other challenging issues of modern life, which she addresses partly to help her fellow black people feel seen.

Elliott's first professional publication was the children's picture book Bird, in 2008. Illustrator Shadra Strickland won the Ezra Jack Keats Book Award in 2009 for New Illustrator for the book. Bird also won the New Voices Award Honor from its publishing company, Lee & Low Books, as well as the 2009 Paterson Prize for Book for Young Readers, and the 2011 West Virginia Children's Choice Book Award. Elliott wrote Bird originally as a short story in 2006, but only found a publisher for it after she and Strickland re-worked it to be a picture book.

Elliott's first YA novels, A Wish After Midnight and its sequel, The Door at the Crossroads, are speculative fiction featuring a black teenager from Brooklyn, NY, who travels back in time to the Brooklyn of 1863.  A Wish After Midnight was originally self-published in 2008, then re-released by Amazon Encore in 2010. The Door at the Crossroads was released in 2016.

The City Books series is aimed at much younger readers, ages 6 (kindergarten) to 10 (4th grade). The series began in 2014 with The Phoenix on Barkley Street, then continued with Dayshaun's Gift in 2015.  Like A Wish After Midnight, Dayshaun's Gift involves sending the protagonist back to 1863, at the time of the New York City draft riots. The story is illustrated by Alex Portal.  Elliott released City Books #3: The Ghosts in the Castle in 2017, along with City Books #4: The Phantom Unicorn. Both are illustrated by Charity Russell.

2015 featured the beginning of Elliott's collaboration with artist and illustrator Purple Wong, who illustrated Elliot's poem I Love Snow! as a children's picture book that year. In 2016 they released A Hand to Hold in February, Billie's Blues (also illustrated by Paul Melecky) in February, and Milo's Museum in November. The poetic picture book about autism Benny Doesn't Like to Be Hugged followed in 2017, and On My Block, also a poem, in 2020.  Reflecting Elliott's activism in encouraging diverse representations in books, a background character in Benny Doesn't Like to Be Hugged is a Native American boy wearing a t-shirt featuring the comic book character Super Indian, a Native super hero created by Arigon Starr.

In 2016, Tilbury House Publishers put out Melena's Jubilee: the story of a fresh start, illustrated with mixed media artwork by Aaron Boyd. It was listed as a Bank Street College of Education 2016 Best Children's Book of the Year with a star for outstanding merit, and was also named a 2017 Skipping Stones Honor Book by the international multicultural magazine Skipping Stones, in publication since 1988.

2017's YA Novel, Mother of the Sea was published by Elliott's own imprint, Rosetta Press, as were many of her titles for children.

The first book in Elliott's urban fantasy series for middle grade children, Dragons in a Bag, was one of Amazon's picks for Amazon Best Children's Book of the Year in 2018. The second book in the series is called The Dragon Thief. Both were published by Random House and illustrated by Geneva B.

Elliot's answer to the question "In this divisive world, what shall we tell our children?" was published in 2018's We Rise, We Resist, We Raise Our Voices, as the poem "You Too Can Fly", illustrated by Laura Freedman. The anthology featured poems, letters, personal essays, art, and other works by 50 luminaries of the field, including Jacqueline Woodson and Kwame Alexander. It was recognized by both Kirkus Reviews and Publishers Weekly as a Best Book of 2018. In the poem, Elliott tells readers:

She is a contributor to Margaret Busby's anthology New Daughters of Africa (2019). Also in 2019, Elliot published a book about writing, Find Your Voice: A Guide to Self-Expression,

Her poetry collection Say Her Name (Poems to Empower) was published by Little, Brown Books for Young Readers in 2020. The collection includes 49 poems, four of which are tributes to other authors: Lucille Clifton, Audre Lorde, Nikki Giovanni, and Phillis Wheatley. The cover and illustrations are by Loveis Wise.  A second collection, called American Phoenix, was published independently later the same year, containing 40 poems.

Bibliography

Children's books
 Bird (2008), illustrated by Shadra Strickland
 The Last Bunny in Brooklyn (2014), illustrated by Babs Webb
 Fox & Crow: A Christmas Tale (2014), illustrated by Babs Webb
 The Magic Mirror (2014)
 The Girl Who Swallowed the Sun (2014), illustrated by Bek Millhouse
 City Books
 City Books 1: The Phoenix on Barkley Street (2014). Pictures by Enroc Illustration
 City Books 2: Dayshaun's Gift (2015), illustrated by Alex Portal
 City Books 3: The Ghosts in the Castle (2017), illustrated by Charity Russell
 City Books 4: The Phantom Unicorn (2017),  illustrated by Charity Russell
 A Wave Came Through Our Window (2015), illustrated by Charity Russell
 I Love Snow! (2015), illustrated by Purple Wong
 A Hand to Hold (2016), illustrated by Purple Wong
 Billie's Blues (2016), illustrated by Paul Melecky and Purple Wong
 Milo's Museum (2016), illustrated by Purple Wong
 Dragons in a Bag
 Dragons in a Bag (2018), illustrated by Geneva B
 The Dragon Thief (2019), illustrated by Geneva B
 The Witch's Apprentice (2022), illustrated by Cherise Harris 
 On My Block (2020), illustrated by Purple Wong
 A Place Inside of Me (2020), illustrated by Noa Denmon

Young Adult (YA) 
 A Wish After Midnight (2008)
 Ship of Souls (2012)
 The Deep (2013)
 The Door at the Crossroads (2016)
 Mother of the Sea (2017)
 The Return (2018)
 Cin's Mark (2018)

Adult Fiction
 One Eye Open (2011)

Poetry 
 "You Can Fly", in We Rise, We Resist, We Raise Our Voices (2018), edited by Wade and Cheryl Hudson
 Say Her Name (Poems to Empower) (2020), illustrated by Loveis Wise
 American Phoenix (Poems) (2020)

Mixed Media 
 Stranger In The Family (2009; a memoir in photography, poetry, and prose)

Awards 
 2005: Bird (published in 2008) – New Voices Award Honor, Lee & Low Books; Ezra Jack Keats Book Award for New Illustrator; 2009 Paterson Prize for Book for Young Readers
 2012: Ship of Souls – Booklist's Top Ten Sci-fi/Fantasy Titles for Youth; finalist for the Phillis Wheatley Book Award
 2018: Dragon in a Bag – Amazon Best Children's Book of the Year selection

References

External links 
 
 
 

Living people
1972 births
20th-century African-American people
20th-century African-American women
21st-century African-American women writers
21st-century African-American writers
21st-century American dramatists and playwrights
21st-century American essayists
21st-century American poets
21st-century American women writers
African-American children's writers
African-American dramatists and playwrights
African-American novelists
African-American poets
American feminist writers
American science fiction writers
American women dramatists and playwrights
American women essayists
American women novelists
American women poets
Black speculative fiction authors
New York University alumni
Women science fiction and fantasy writers